Southend-on-Sea Corporation Tramways served the town of Southend-on-Sea in Essex from 19 July 1901 until 8 April 1942.

History

Until the 19th century, Southend-on-Sea did not exist as a place, and the established centres of population were at Leigh-on-Sea to the west and Prittlewell to the north. However, it was developed as a bathing resort in the 18th century, and the first pier was constructed in 1830. This allowed passenger-carrying steamers to visit the town, but only at certain times. Consequently, the pier was extended to reach deep water in 1846, so that the steamers could visit at all states of the tide. A narrow gauge horse tramway was constructed along the pier in 1851, and the arrival of the London, Tilbury and Southend Railway in 1854 led to the development of Southend as a holiday resort for Londoners and a dormitory town for people who worked in London.

As the town expanded, there was a need for public transport, and so a  gauge electric tramway, using overhead wires to supply the power, was constructed, and opened for business on 19 July 1901. Lines ran from Victoria Circus, at the top of the High Street, to Leigh-on-Sea and Southchurch. A branch ran from Southend Victoria railway station along Southchurch Avenue to reach the beach, while a circular route ran northwards along Victoria Avenue to Prittlewell, where it turned west along West Road, and then southwards along North Road to reach the Cricketers Hotel, where it rejoined the route to Leigh-on-Sea. The initial rolling stock consisted of three batches of trams, all built by the Brush Electrical Engineering Company. The Corporation ordered three more 8-wheel trams from Brush's in 1902. Cars 15 to 17 had open upper decks. The next batch of five trams, cars 18 to 22 were of a similar design, but were ordered from G.F. Milnes & Co.

Robert Birkett became the general manager on 1 July 1905, and set about expanding the network and modernising the fleet. The seafront line was extended eastwards, reaching Bryant Avenue in August 1908, the "Halfway House" pub and Thorpe Hall Corner in 1909, and turning away from the sea to reach Thorpe Bay in February 1912. The route to Prittlewell was not proving to be profitable, and the section along North Road was abandoned in January 1912, with the tracks being lifted soon afterwards. The depot on London Road became an engineers workshop, where many of the early trams were rebuilt. The single deck cars 13 and 14 were rebuilt as open topped double decked cars between 1907 and 1909. The seating capacity of the 4-wheeled trams was increased from 38 to 62. Car 6 had extra bulkheads built at the end of the lower saloon, and the upper deck was extended over the driver's position. Several other cars were cut in half and an extra window section inserted. Cars 3, 5, 8 and 11 were fitted with replacement open topped bodies, and the original trucks were reconditioned. New 8-wheeled cars, numbered 23 to 25 were ordered in 1909 from the United Electric Car Company of Preston, who had taken over Milnes, and six more 4-wheeled, open topped cars were built by Brush in 1910. They were numbered 26 to 31, to be followed by two more batches, cars 33 to 36 and 37 to 39, which were of a similar design, and were delivered by Brush in 1912.

Electrical power for the tramway was supplied by a generating station located near the London Road depot, and it was decided to transport coal from the coal pier on the seafront to the generating station along the tramway. The Corporation owned a small loading pier on the sea front, near to the gas works, and this was rebuilt in 1914, incorporating a spur to enable trams to run onto it. Three 4-wheel coal trams, numbered 1A to 3A, were built by Grenshaw & Piers of Bolton, with cabs at both ends, and two large "V"-skips between them. They were painted grey, and worked from 1915 until the early 1930s, when the steam engines at the power station were replaced by diesel generators. The original generating sets produced 200 kilowatts each, and were driven by vertical compound Corliss steam engines. All of the tramcars used swivel head trolleys, to pick up the power from the overhead wires. These had the advantage that the wires did not need to be above the centre line of the track, and presented a less cluttered appearance in the streets, particularly when there was double track.

Further extensions to the system occurred in the run up to World War I. The tracks along Southchurch Road were extended eastwards to Bournes Green in 1913, and in 1914, they were extended again to join up with the tracks at Thorpe Bay. This created a circular route to the east of Southend. Unlike most of the rest of the system, these extensions were created on separate rights of way, rather than along roads, and the double track boulevards were lined with trees. Four single deck toastrack cars were ordered from Brush Engineering in 1914 for use on the circular route, to be numbered 40 to 43, but only the first three arrived before the onset of the war, and the fourth one was not delivered until 1921. The Corporation also took delivery of a batch of 12 8-wheeled vehicles from Brush in 1921, and for the first time the top deck was enclosed. They were numbered 44 to 55. The final batch of six new trams was built by English Electric in 1923, carrying the fleet numbers 56 to 61. A large amount of refurbishment work took place between 1925 and 1927, with many of the open topped vehicles receiving a roof on the upper deck, and later windscreens were added to protect the driver from the elements.

The route along the boulevards was thought to be unprofitable, and there were attempts within the council to stop the service during the winter months. The tramways department paid the wages of six gardeners to maintain the gardens along the route, and profitability returned when the gardeners were transferred to the parks department. Pictures of the boulevards give an impression of woodland, rather than an urban tramway, and this impression was further enhanced by the planting of grass between the rails.

The English Electric trams were the last new-build trams bought by the Corporation, but in 1934 they purchased some second-hand vehicles. Cars 62 to 65 came from the Middlesbrough Corporation Tramways system when that closed, and had been built by Hurst Nelson in 1921. They had two decks, with a roof on the upper deck, but open balconies at either end. Cars 66 to 68 came from Accrington Corporation Tramways, and had been built by Brush in 1919-1920. They were fully enclosed double deck trams, with 8 wheels, and again had to be regauged, as the Accrington system was  gauge.

Decline
In 1925, the Corporation looked at replacing the trams with trolleybuses. Two vehicles were hired for evaluation, and were used to supplement the trams on the route to Prittlewell. The trial proved to be successful, and trolleybuses replaced the trams on that route on 28 December 1928. More trolleybuses were purchased, and trams were withdrawn and scrapped to reduce the size of the fleet. By 1938, much of the track was in poor condition and in need of renewal. The northern part of the eastern loop, from Southchurch to Thorpe Bay, closed on 6 July 1938, though in this case the trams were replaced by motorbuses, and trolleybuses took over on the seafront section from the Kursaal to Thorpe Bay on 3 June 1939.

The rest of the system would probably have been closed soon afterwards, but the advent of World War II delayed the closure programme, and the system lasted until 8 April 1942. The Light Railway Transport League organised a farewell visit on 8 February 1942. The trolleybuses lasted until 28 October 1954, when pressure for an integrated transport network based on the motor bus caused their demise.

Infrastructure
The system had its hub at Victoria Circus, with a small loop around Southchurch Road, Chichester Road, Warrior Square and the High Street. From this hub the routes were:

 opened July 1901 - along Victoria Avenue, West Street, North Road, London Road returning to Victoria Circus. In 1912 most of the North Road section was closed, leaving a terminus just off West Street at grid reference .
 opened July 1901 - along Southchurch Road, Southchurch Avenue to the esplanade.
 opened August 1901 - along London Road, Leigh Road and Broadway to a terminus in Leigh-on-Sea at grid reference  adjacent to St Clement's Church.
 opened August 1908 - extension along the esplanade to The Halfway House.
 opened February 1912 - extension along the esplanade to Thorpe Bay.
 opened July 1913 - along Southchurch Road, Southchurch Boulevard to Bournes Green.
 opened July 1914 - extension from Bournes Green to Thorpe Bay to complete the loop.
 opened 1914 - spur from the esplanade onto the newly rebuilt Corporation Loading Pier at grid reference .

The depot was on London Road at grid reference , which is now the site of the London Road Retail Park.

Tramcars
The fleet, in a livery of cream and green, consisted of:
 65 double deck tramcars.
 6 single deck tramcars.

Bibliography

References

External links
 Southend-on-Sea Corporation Tramways on the British Tramway Company Badges and Buttons website
 Southend-on-Sea Corporation Tramways ticket

See also
List of town tramway systems in the United Kingdom
Arriva Southend

Tram transport in England
Transport in Southend-on-Sea
Rail transport in Essex
3 ft 6 in gauge railways in England